West Warren Street Historic District is a national historic district located at Shelby, Cleveland County, North Carolina.  It encompasses 176 contributing buildings, one contributing site, and one contributing object in a residential section of Shelby.  The houses date between about 1918 and the 1940s, and include representative examples of Late Victorian, Queen Anne, and Bungalow / American Craftsman architectural styles.  Notable nonresidential buildings include the Graham Elementary School drinking fountain (1927–1928) and Young Brothers Storage Building (1940s).

It was listed on the National Register of Historic Places in 2009.

Gallery

References

Historic districts on the National Register of Historic Places in North Carolina
Victorian architecture in North Carolina
Queen Anne architecture in North Carolina
Buildings and structures in Cleveland County, North Carolina
National Register of Historic Places in Cleveland County, North Carolina